The 62nd (2nd West Riding) Division was an infantry division of the British Army that saw active service on the Western Front during the First World War.

History 
During the First World War the division fought on the Western Front at Bullecourt in the Battle of Arras and Havrincourt in the Battle of Cambrai. During Operation Michael, in 1918, they were in the line near Arras and in the Second Battle of the Marne, in the Ardre Valley. At the opening of Second Battle of the Somme (1918), they fought the Battle of Havrincourt and continued across the Saint Quentin Canal at Marcoing, before beginning the fighting advance to Maubeuge on the Sambre.

Order of Battle 
The order of battle was as follows: 
185th (2/1st West Riding) Brigade
 2/5th Battalion, Prince of Wales's Own (West Yorkshire Regiment) (joined March 1915, left August 1918)
 2/6th Battalion, Prince of Wales's Own (West Yorkshire Regiment) (joined March 1915, left January 1918)
 2/7th Battalion, Prince of Wales's Own (West Yorkshire Regiment) (joined March 1915, left June 1918)
 2/8th Battalion, Prince of Wales's Own (West Yorkshire Regiment) (joined March 1915, left February 1918)
 1/8th Battalion, Prince of Wales's Own (West Yorkshire Regiment) (joined January 1918)
 1/5th (Prince of Wales's) Battalion, Devonshire Regiment (joined June 1918)
 2/20th (County of London) Battalion, London Regiment (joined August 1918)

186th (2/2nd West Riding) Brigade
 2/4th Battalion, Duke of Wellington's (West Riding Regiment) (joined March 1915)
 2/5th Battalion, Duke of Wellington's (West Riding Regiment) (joined March 1915, left January 1918)
 2/6th Battalion, Duke of Wellington's (West Riding Regiment) (joined March 1915, disbanded January 1918)
 2/7th Battalion, Duke of Wellington's (West Riding Regiment) (joined March 1915, left as a cadre June 1918)
 5th Battalion, Duke of Wellington's (West Riding Regiment) (joined January 1918)
 2/4th Battalion, Hampshire Regiment (joined June 1918)

187th (2/3rd West Riding) Brigade
 2/4th Battalion, King's Own (Yorkshire Light Infantry) (joined March 1915)
 2/5th Battalion, King's Own (Yorkshire Light Infantry) (joined March 1915, absorbed 1/5th Bn and became simply 5th Bn February 1918)
 2/4th Hallamshire Battalion, York and Lancaster Regiment (joined March 1915)
 2/5th Battalion, York and Lancaster Regiment (joined March 1915, disbanded February 1918)

62nd (2nd West Riding) Divisional Artillery
 2/I West Riding Brigade, Royal Field Artillery (RFA) (became CCCX Brigade May 1916)
 2/II West Riding Brigade, RFA (became CCCXI Brigade May 1916; left as independent Army Field Artillery Brigade January 1917)
 2/III West Riding Brigade, RFA (became CCCXII Brigade May 1916)
 2/IV West Riding (Howitzer) Brigade, RFA (broken up May 1916)

General Officer Commanding 
 Major General Sir James Trotter February 1915 – December 1915
 Major-General Walter Braithwaite December 1915 – August 1918
 Major-General Robert Whigham August 1918 – 1919

See also

 List of British divisions in World War I

References

Bibliography

 Maj A.F. Becke,History of the Great War: Order of Battle of Divisions, Part 2b: The 2nd-Line Territorial Force Divisions (57th–69th), with the Home-Service Divisions (71st–73rd) and 74th and 75th Divisions, London: HM Stationery Office, 1937/Uckfield: Naval & Military Press, 2007, ISBN 1-847347-39-8.
 Laurie Magnus, The West Riding Territorials in the Great War, London: Keegan Paul, Trench, Trubner, 1920//Uckfield: Naval & Military Press, 2004, ISBN 1-845740-77-7.

External links 
 Summary of 62nd Division history
 A more detailed history
 An operation which earned the 62nd Div much respect

Infantry divisions of the British Army in World War I
Military units and formations established in 1914
Military units and formations disestablished in 1919
1914 establishments in the United Kingdom